Words of Love is a compilation album by Buddy Holly and the Crickets. It was released by PolyGram in 1993 and reached number one on the UK Albums Chart, where it was a posthumous number one. The album was certified gold in the UK.

Track listing
"Words of Love"
"That'll Be the Day"
"Peggy Sue"
"Think It Over"
"True Love Ways"
"What to Do"
"Crying. Waiting. Hoping"
"Well... All Right"
"Love's Made a Fool of You"
"Peggy Sue Got Married"
"Valley of Tears"
"Wishing"
"Raining in My Heart"
"Oh, Boy!"
"Rave on"
"Brown Eyed Handsome Man"
"Bo Diddley"
"It's So Easy"
"It Doesn't Matter Anymore"
"Maybe Baby"
"Early in the Morning"
"Love Is Strange"
"Listen to Me"
"I'm Gonna Love You Too"
"Learning the Game"
"Baby I Don't Care"
"Heartbeat"
"Everyday"

Chart performance

Year-end charts

References

External links

1993 compilation albums
Buddy Holly compilation albums
Albums produced by Norman Petty
Compilation albums published posthumously